Dieter Orendorz (born 1 August 1992) is a German professional ice hockey defenceman, currently signed with ESV Kaufbeuren of the DEL2 for the 2022–23 season. His early career was played with the Iserlohn Roosters in the Deutsche Eishockey Liga (DEL) during 2009 to 2021.

In 2020, he married German national ice hockey team defenseman Rebecca Orendorz.

References

External links

1992 births
Living people
German ice hockey defencemen
Iserlohn Roosters players
People from Iserlohn
Kassel Huskies players
ESV Kaufbeuren players
Sportspeople from Arnsberg (region)